The 2018 Pan American Weightlifting Championships was held in Santo Domingo, Dominican Republic between May 12 and May 19, 2018.

A total of 126 weightlifters qualified to compete at the 2019 Pan American Games through scores from both the 2017 and 2018 Pan American Championships combined. A nation may enter a maximum of 12 weightlifters (six per gender). The host nation (Peru) automatically qualified the maximum team size.

Medal summary
Results are obtained from the Pan American Weightlifting Federation website.

Men

Women

Medals tables

Results including snatch and clean & jerk medals

Total results

Team ranking

Men

Women

References

External links
Results

Pan American Weightlifting Championships
Pan American Weightlifting Championships
Pan American Weightlifting Championships
International weightlifting competitions hosted by the Dominican Republic
Weightlifting in the Dominican Republic
Qualification tournaments for the 2019 Pan American Games